Wigtownshire RFC is a rugby union side based in Stranraer, Dumfries and Galloway, Scotland. They run a Men's XV and a Woman's XV.

History
Wigtownshire play Newton Stewart in their local derby for the Spice Cup.

Jessie Helen Ferguson won a M.B.E in the 1996 New Years Honours LIst for services to Wigtownshire Rugby Football Club.

London Road was to host Glasgow Warriors match against Ulster Rugby on 31 July 1999.

The club reached the final of the National Bowl in 2018.

Wigtownshire Sevens
Wigtownshire run the Wigtownshire Sevens tournament.

Notable former players

Outside of rugby
The following former Wigtownshire players are notable outside of rugby

Honours
 Wigtownshire Sevens
 Champions: 1956, 1960, 1967, 1969, 1988, 1990, 1991, 1995, 1996
 West Three
 Champions: 2018
 Dumfries Sevens
 Champions: 1974, 1975, 1990
 Cumnock Sevens
 Champions: 1990
 Stewartry Sevens
 Champions: 1978, 1979, 1988, 1992
 Ayr Sevens
 Champions: 1996

References 

Rugby union in Dumfries and Galloway
Scottish rugby union teams
Stranraer